Eric Johansson (born 28 June 2000) is a Swedish handball player for THW Kiel and the Swedish national team.

He represented Sweden in the 2022 European Men's Handball Championship and won gold medal.

Achievements 
 DHB-Supercup
 : 2022
 Norwegian League
 : 2022
 Norwegian Cup
 : 2021

Individual awards
 Handball-Planet – Best World Young Handball Player: 2022

References

External links
 Eric Johansson at European Handball Federation

2000 births
Living people
Swedish male handball players
Expatriate handball players
Swedish expatriate sportspeople in Norway
Swedish expatriate sportspeople in Germany
People from Eskilstuna
Sportspeople from Södermanland County
Handball-Bundesliga players
THW Kiel players
21st-century Swedish people